The 2016 New York Red Bulls II season is the club's second season of existence, and their second in United Soccer League, the third-tier of the American soccer pyramid. The Red Bulls II play in the Eastern Division of USL.

Club

Coaching staff

Squad information

Appearances and goals are career totals from all-competitions.

Competitions

USL

Eastern Conference standings

Results

USL Playoffs

Player statistics

Top scorers

As of  24 October 2016.

Assist Leaders

As of 24 October 2016.  This table does not include secondary assists.

Clean sheets

As of 24 October 2016.

References 

New York Red Bulls II seasons
2016 USL season
American soccer clubs 2016 season
2016 in sports in New Jersey
2016 in sports in New York (state)